Starr School is a census-designated place (CDP) in Glacier County, Montana, United States. The population was 252 at the 2010 census.

Geography
Starr School is located at  (48.587146, -113.128146), northwest of Browning. It is on the Blackfeet Indian Reservation.

Demographics

As of the census of 2000, there were 248 people, 61 households, and 58 families residing in the CDP. The population density was 60.8 people per square mile (23.5/km). There were 67 housing units at an average density of 16.4/sq mi (6.3/km). The racial makeup of the CDP was 2.42% White, 97.18% Native American, and 0.40% from two or more races.

There were 61 households, out of which 49.2% had children under the age of 18 living with them, 50.8% were married couples living together, 29.5% had a female householder with no husband present, and 4.9% were non-families. 4.9% of all households were made up of individuals, and 1.6% had someone living alone who was 65 years of age or older. The average household size was 4.07 and the average family size was 4.14.

In the CDP, the population was spread out, with 42.3% under the age of 18, 11.7% from 18 to 24, 22.6% from 25 to 44, 18.1% from 45 to 64, and 5.2% who were 65 years of age or older. The median age was 23 years. For every 100 females, there were 112.0 males. For every 100 females age 18 and over, there were 95.9 males.

The median income for a household in the CDP was $24,531, and the median income for a family was $24,531. Males had a median income of $35,972 versus $31,250 for females. The per capita income for the CDP was $8,105. About 18.5% of families and 20.2% of the population were below the poverty line, including 22.5% of those under the age of eighteen and none of those 65 or over.

References

Census-designated places in Glacier County, Montana
Census-designated places in Montana